James Melville Balfour (2 June 1831 – 19 December 1869) was a Scottish-born New Zealand marine engineer. He is best remembered for the network of lighthouses that he designed. Balfour was a highly energetic man, who despite drowning after only six years in the country, has left an impressive list of projects either designed or constructed by him. He was initially employed by the Otago Provincial Council before his appointment by the Government of New Zealand as the colonial marine engineer.

Early life and family 

Balfour was born in the manse of Colinton Parish Church south-west of Edinburgh, Scotland on 2 June 1831. He was the youngest son of Rev. Lewis Balfour (1777–1860), D.D., who for 37 years was minister for the Colinton parish. The philosopher James Balfour was his father's paternal grandfather, and the physician Robert Whytt was his father's maternal grandfather. His father had married Anne Mackintosh on 24 February 1806. Among his siblings were the physician and heart specialist George William Balfour (1823–1903), and Margaret Isabella "Maggie" Balfour (1829–1897) who in 1848 married the lighthouse builder Thomas Stevenson. They were the parents of the author Robert Louis Stevenson.

He received his education at Edinburgh High School and the University of Edinburgh. He studied civil engineering and for his training, he attended workshops in Scotland and, to study optics, in Germany. He did an apprenticeship with famous lighthouse builders, the brothers Thomas and David Stevenson, David being his sister's husband, and he worked in the lighthouse department of the firm.

Balfour married Christina Simson and their only child, Marie Clothilde Balfour, was born in 1862. She married her first cousin James Craig Balfour, the son of Balfour's brother George.

Career in New Zealand 
The Balfour family arrived in Port Chalmers on board the Sir Ralph Abercromby on 14 September 1863. Both Balfour and his friend and colleague, Thomas Paterson, had accepted appointments by the Otago Provincial Council for engineering positions. Balfour came as a marine engineer, while Paterson was a bridge, railway and road engineer. Paterson was half a year older than Balfour, and they had attended the same school in Edinburgh. Balfour brought with him from Scotland the lamp equipment he had designed for the proposed lighthouses at Cape Saunders and Taiaroa Head.

Balfour is described as having had "enormous energy", and within half a year, he had commenced a large number of projects. His contract with the provincial council was terminated at the end of 1866 (it is not clear whether this was Balfour's choice), and he then became colonial marine engineer on appointment by the government in Wellington.

Death 

Balfour's friend Paterson drowned in mid-December 1869 when his coach overturned while crossing the Kakanui River. Upon hearing of his friend's death, Balfour made immediate arrangements to travel to his funeral. On 19 December 1869, eight passengers transferred by whale boat from Timaru Harbour during heavy sea to the SS Maori, which was anchored some distance offshore. The whale boat got into trouble, but the passengers could be transferred into a life boat sent by the SS Maori. A wave washed the lifeboat against the SS Maori, and caused it to overturn. Two of the passengers drowned, including Balfour.

Balfour's name is listed on the wall of the family vault in Colinton.

Balfour was a leading engineer, and it was expected that he would eventually have succeeded John Blackett as Engineer-in-Chief of the Public Works Department.

List of projects 
Below is a list of lighthouses either designed by Balfour, or designed and supervised. Some of these are registered by Heritage New Zealand (formerly known as the New Zealand Historic Places Trust).

Commemoration 

The name of a small town in Southland originally known as Longridge was changed to Balfour to avoid confusion other New Zealand localities of that name. It is uncertain whether the new name refers to an employee of the Waimea Company who lived locally, or the provincial engineer.

When Eleanor Catton started working on her novel The Luminaries, she used the Papers Past website of the National Library of New Zealand to find suitable names for her characters, set during the time of the West Coast Gold Rush (1864–1867). Balfour was active on the West Coast during that time, and it is assumed that Catton adopted his surname for the character of the shipping agent Thomas Balfour, who represents Sagittarius in the Man Booker Prize-winning novel.

Notes and references

Notes

References 

Books

Newspapers

Websites

1831 births
1869 deaths
New Zealand civil engineers
New Zealand marine engineers
Engineers from Edinburgh
Scottish emigrants to New Zealand
People educated at the Royal High School, Edinburgh
Alumni of the University of Edinburgh College of Science and Engineering